Cacotherapia angulalis is a species of snout moth in the genus Cacotherapia. It was described by William Barnes and James Halliday McDunnough in 1918 and is known from the US state of California.

References

Cacotherapiini
Moths described in 1918